Tarnów is a Polish parliamentary constituency in the Lesser Poland Voivodeship.  It elects twelve members of the Sejm and three members of the Senate.

The district has the number '15' for elections to the Sejm and the Senate, and is named after the city of Tarnów.  It includes the counties of Bochnia, Brzesko, Dąbrowa, Proszowice, Tarnów, Wieliczka and the city-county of Tarnów.

List of members

2019-2023

References

Electoral districts of Poland